MV Coruisk is a Caledonian Maritime Assets Limited ferry built in 2003, operated by Scottish ferry operator Caledonian MacBrayne and serving the west coast of Scotland.

History
Following her launch at Appledore's yard in early 2003, Coruisk left on her delivery voyage on 2 August. She carried out berthing trials on the Clyde before taking over the Mallaig to Armadale route on 14 August. She was officially named at Armadale by Baroness Ray Michie of Gallanach at a special ceremony.

Initial technical problems required  to resume the service for some time. On 24 August, Coruisk lost power and struck a reef at the Mallaig harbour entrance, losing one of her propulsion units. She went to the Clyde for repairs and did not return to Mallaig that season. The following winter season at Dunoon was only slightly more successful, with slow berthing and many passenger complaints adding to her worsening reputation.  Subsequent seasons have been less eventful.

In March 2014, she ran into the pier at Dunoon, sustaining serious damage but managed to make her own way to Greenock to be assessed for repairs.

Layout
The design of Coruisk is unique. As well as bow and stern ramps, allowing drive-through operation, she also has a port side ramp, allowing side-loading on the Clyde in winter months. The bow ramp is protected by an open visor, similar to those found on Orkney and Shetland inter-island ferries.

Above the car deck are two passenger decks, one containing the main lounge areas with toilets and a small shop/kiosk. A small external deck area on the same level, both fore and aft of the lounges, has stairways leading to the open deck above. Crew accommodation is on the upper deck. Sitting even further up, the bridge gives the master a view down over bow and stern. A temporary modification is made for the winter seasons to accommodate the gangways at Wemyss Bay and Rothesay.

Schottel electric azimuth thrusters incorporate rotating pods protruding beneath the hull, with two propellers on each. Although similar to Voith Schneider units, the vessel proved much harder to control and manoeuvre.

Service
Coruisk was the sole vessel on the Mallaig to Armadale service in summers until 2016. In winter, she relieves on the Upper Clyde, while  adds Armadale to her Small Isles roster. Since 2011, when the Gourock to Dunoon service (operated by Argyll Ferries until 2019) became passenger-only, Coruisk relieves at Rothesay and provides support on the Dunoon crossing.

From March 2016 until July 2022, Coruisk was the second ferry on the Oban–Craignure route on the summer timetable, alongside . That arrangement was expected to continue until  and Hull 802 entered service, but in summer 2022, when  entered service at Craignure, Coruisk returned to Mallaig.

References

External links

Caledonian MacBrayne
Ships built in Devon
2003 ships
Ferries of Scotland